The 1960–61 season was Mansfield Town's 23rd season in the Football League and 1st in the Fourth Division, they finished in 20th position with 38 points.

Final league table

Results

Football League Fourth Division

FA Cup

League Cup

Squad statistics
 Squad list sourced from

References
General
 Mansfield Town 1960–61 at soccerbase.com (use drop down list to select relevant season)

Specific

Mansfield Town F.C. seasons
Mansfield Town